Marcus Daniell and David Marrero were the defending champions but chose not to defend their title.

Raúl Brancaccio and Flavio Cobolli won the title after defeating Alberto Barroso Campos and Roberto Carballés Baena 6–3, 7–6(7–4) in the final.

Seeds

Draw

References

External links
 Main draw

Murcia Open - Doubles